The Girlfriend Experience is a 2009 American slice of life drama film directed by Steven Soderbergh and starring  then-pornographic actress Sasha Grey. It was shot in New York City, and a rough cut was screened at the Sundance Film Festival in January 2009. The film was also made available on Amazon Video on Demand as a pre-theatrical rental.

Soderbergh mentioned Michelangelo Antonioni's Red Desert and Ingmar Bergman's Cries and Whispers as influences. The film is also notable because it was produced for $1.3 million and was shot with a relatively inexpensive Red One camera.

Synopsis

In the days leading up to the 2008 presidential election, a high-end Manhattan escort meets the challenges of her boyfriend, her clients, and her work. Chelsea (real name Christine) specializes in offering girlfriend experiences. She finds that lately her clients are spending less and less on her services, and are troubled by the financial crisis, a topic they raise frequently in her company. She is also interviewed by a journalist, who quizzes her about her work and personal life. She goes from client to client performing her services.

Cast
 Sasha Grey as Christine, alias Chelsea
 Chris Santos as Chris
 Emma Lahana as Adrian
 Philip Eytan as Philip
 Timothy Davis as Tim
 Peter Zizzo as Zizzo
 Glenn Kenny as "The Erotic Connoisseur"
 Vincent Dellacera as Chelsea's Driver
 Kimberly Magness as Happy Hour
 Mark Jacobson as Interviewer
Kenneth Myers as Craft Steak Maître d’

Reception
, the film has a 67% approval rating on the review aggregator site Rotten Tomatoes based on 139 reviews with an average rating of 6.39/10. The website's critics consensus states: "Steven Soderbergh's latest lo-fi production is strikingly crafted but emotionally vague".

Roger Ebert rated the film four out of four stars, saying "This film is true about human nature. It clearly sees needs and desires. It is not universal, but within its particular focus, it is unrelenting."

On the opposite end of the spectrum, Kyle Smith of the New York Post awarded the film 1 star out of 4, saying "Time for another of Steven Soderbergh's 'experimental,' i.e., half-assed, films." David Edelstein of New York Magazine complained that, "Most of the dialogue is listless, and no matter how much Soderbergh snips and stitches, the movie is a corpse with twitching limbs." Luke Davies, critic for The Monthly, wrote that the film is "disposable and pretentious" and "is shot sombrely and austerely, in a style that might be described as 'vacuous chic'" and concluded that "as a film in which a porn star's presence is a fundamental marketing hook, it is masturbation."

Television series

In June 2014, Starz committed to a 13-episode order for a new television series, based on the film, with Soderbergh and Philip Fleishman as executive producers. Lodge Kerrigan and Amy Seimetz co-wrote and directed all 13 episodes. Though the main character uses the same name as Sasha Grey’s character in the film, Grey does not appear in the film. Riley Keough starred as the new lead, described by Soderbergh as "a new character on a new trajectory". Season 2 featured new stories focusing on two different sets of characters. Season 3 was announced in July by Starz. The third season, featuring Julia Goldani Telles in the lead, premiered on May 2, 2021.

References

External links
 
 
 
 
 
 

2009 drama films
2009 films
2009 independent films
American avant-garde and experimental films
American drama films
Films about prostitution in the United States
Films directed by Steven Soderbergh
Films produced by Gregory Jacobs
Films set in 2008
Films set in Manhattan
2000s avant-garde and experimental films
Films scored by David Holmes (musician)
2000s English-language films
2000s American films